Trematocranus is a small genus of haplochromine cichlids endemic to Lake Malawi.

Species
There are currently four recognized species in this genus:, with a new species described in 2018.
 Trematocranus labifer (Trewavas, 1935)
 Trematocranus microstoma Trewavas, 1935 (Pointedhead Haplo)
 Trematocranus pachychilus Dierickx, Hanssens, Rusuwa, Snoeks, 2018
 Trematocranus placodon (Regan, 1922)

References

 
Haplochromini

Cichlid genera
Taxa named by Ethelwynn Trewavas
Taxonomy articles created by Polbot